The enzyme cetraxate benzylesterase (EC 3.1.1.70) catalyzes the reaction 

cetraxate benzyl ester + H2O  cetraxate + benzyl alcohol

This enzyme belongs to the family of hydrolases, specifically those acting on carboxylic ester bonds.  The systematic name is cetraxate-benzyl-ester benzylhydrolase.

References

 

EC 3.1.1
Enzymes of unknown structure